Christian Steenstrup (December 2, 1873 – November 28, 1955) was a Danish inventor who invented the hermetically sealed refrigeration unit while Chief Engineer at General Electric, and held over 100 patents.
His improvement to the refrigerator sent the sales of the G.E. Monitor Top refrigerator soaring.
Streenstrup immigrated to the US in 1894.

References 

1873 births
1955 deaths
American inventors
Danish emigrants to the United States